Acianthera angustisepala is a species of plant in the Orchidaceae family.

Distribution 
It is endemic from Mexico to Guatemala. It was formerly subordinated to the genus Pleurothallis .

Description 
Acianthera angustisepala is found in forests at elevations of 800 to 1350 meters .

Taxonomy 
It was named by Alec Melton Pridgeon, and Mark Wayne Chase in Lindleyana 16: 247 in 2001.

References 

angustisepala
Taxa named by Mark Wayne Chase